Ferdjioua District is a district of Mila Province, Algeria.

The district is further divided into 2 municipalities:
Ferdjioua
Yahia Beniguecha

Districts of Mila Province